was a Japanese samurai of the Sengoku period who served the Uesugi clan. Prior to joining the Uesugi, Kojima had been a senior vassal of Jinbō Nagamoto. In 1582, he provoke a Ikkō-ikki and took Toyama Castle.

Notes

References
 Abe, Yoshichiro Sengoku no Kassen Zenroku (戦国の合戦全録) Japan, 1973

Uesugi retainers
Samurai